Interstate 49 (I-49) is an Interstate Highway in the US state of Missouri that was designated on December 12, 2012. It overlaps U.S. Route 71 (US 71) in the western part of the state, beginning at the Arkansas state line, and ending at I-435 and I-470 on the southeast side of Kansas City.

Upon completion, the highway will connect Kansas City to Texarkana, Arkansas, and Shreveport and Lafayette, Louisiana.

Route description
I-49 enters Missouri from the Arkansas state line on the Bella Vista Bypass near Pineville. It passes through many smaller communities before reaching Joplin. In Joplin, I-49 junctions with I-44 and begins a short overlap with I-44 between exits 11 and 18, heading east.

Just a few miles east of Joplin, I-49 leaves I-44, heads north, and enters Carthage. I-49 then passes through Nevada and other communities before reaching the Kansas City area. I-49 intersects with I-470 and I-435, which provide connections to I-70, Downtown Loop, I-35, and I-29.

In south Kansas City, at Bannister Road just north of the Grandview Triangle, the I-49 designation ends, and the freeway continues as I-435 north to I-70 west and the expressway continues as US 71, which proceeds into downtown Kansas City as Bruce R. Watkins Memorial Drive.

History

Arkansas and Missouri pursued an I-49 designation for US 71 and I-540 for a number of years. In the early 2000s, there were plans by both states to renumber the roadway as such between I-44 west of Joplin and I-40 at Fort Smith once new roadway had been completed around Bella Vista, Arkansas, and north to Pineville, Missouri. However, the American Association of State Highway and Transportation Officials (AASHTO) Special Committee on U.S. Route Numbering denied the I-49 designation at their annual meeting in September 2007 because none of the new roadway was under construction.

The I-49 upgrade involved removing all at-grade intersections and constructing interchanges and overpasses at 15 sites between Harrisonville and Lamar. The two-year project represented a shift in funding priorities for the Missouri Department of Transportation (MoDOT), which, in 2007, had announced the indefinite postponement of its portion of the Bella Vista bypass project, citing a $139-million (equivalent to $ in ) funding gap in Arkansas between construction costs and toll revenues, and Arkansas's commitment to only a two-lane bypass constructed over six years. MoDOT announced the Joplin-to-Kansas City upgrade of US 71 in August 2010, to be done with the intention of bringing the I-49 designation to Missouri. 

MoDOT began installing I-49 trailblazer signage (without shields) as well as gantry signs and milemarkers, about 1200 signs in all, in February 2012. Signage bearing I-49 shields were covered or turned from view until the I-49 designation was given final approval by the Federal Highway Administration (FHWA). This includes milemarkers at  intervals along the entire alignment apart from I-44.

The I-49 designation in Missouri became official at noon on December 12, 2012.

In 2012, Missouri had $40 million (equivalent to $ in ) available for its portion of the Bella Vista bypass but moved the money elsewhere in 2013. They planned on using money from a proposed constitutional amendment which would have raised the sales tax; however, this was defeated by voters in August 2014. Arkansas announced it will not extend its section to Missouri until construction begins on the Missouri section.

In March 2019, the Missouri Highways and Transportation Commission approved the remaining funding needed to complete the portion of the Bella Vista Bypass within the state. On April 1, 2020, the Missouri Highways and Transportation Commission awarded a $58.7 million contract for the construction of the  portion of highway. Construction started on May 11, 2020, and the entire bypass opened on October 1, 2021, following a ribbon-cutting ceremony held the day prior. With this, I-49 is fully complete within the state.

I-435 north to I-70 west to the Downtown Loop was via an alternate route for traffic to avoid the three at-grade crossings.

Exit list

References

External links

49
 Missouri
Transportation in McDonald County, Missouri
Transportation in Newton County, Missouri
Transportation in Jasper County, Missouri
Transportation in Barton County, Missouri
Transportation in Vernon County, Missouri
Transportation in Bates County, Missouri
Transportation in Cass County, Missouri
Transportation in Jackson County, Missouri